This is a list of Australian rules football players who have died either during their respective playing careers or due to career-ending injury or disease incurred during their playing career. It includes both on-field and off-field deaths. People who had announced their retirement from playing despite still being at an age when they could still have been active, or who only continued to play in low-level amateur or exhibition matches are not listed.

See also
List of Victorian Football League players who died on active service

References

Death in Australia-related lists
Deaths